Kim Yong-Jun (born 19 July 1983) is a North Korean international football manager and former player and current coach.

Club career stats

Goals for senior national team

References

External links

FIFA

Living people
North Korean footballers
North Korea international footballers
North Korean expatriate footballers
Expatriate footballers in China
1983 births
Pyongyang Sports Club players
Pyongyang Sports Club managers
Yanbian Funde F.C. players
Chengdu Tiancheng F.C. players
Chinese Super League players
China League One players
North Korean expatriate sportspeople in China
2010 FIFA World Cup players
2011 AFC Asian Cup players
Footballers at the 2002 Asian Games
Footballers at the 2006 Asian Games
Footballers at the 2010 Asian Games
Association football midfielders
2019 AFC Asian Cup managers
Asian Games competitors for North Korea
North Korean football managers